Jerry Mills was a performer at the Pekin Theatre in Chicago. and in films.

One of his stage performances was described as offering "ludicrous comedy" and "remarkable eccentric dancing".

Theater
The Merry Widower (1908)

Filmography
The Railroad Porter
The Grafter and the Girl (1913)

References

African-American actors
Male actors from Chicago
American male film actors
American male stage actors
Year of birth missing
Place of birth missing